Jagran Public School, Lucknow is a Public School in Lucknow, Uttar Pradesh, India. Established in 2007, it is affiliated to CBSE Delhi. The school is a part of the Jagran Education Foundation, an initiative of Dainik Jagran. The school hostel can accommodate up to 200 boys and girls.

SCHOOL CAMPUS

The building, built in the Viraj Khand-2 of Gomti Nagar, is surrounded by gardens and playfields. The four-storey building houses 45 ventilated classrooms, a QUAD assembly area, an open-air theatre, a school hall, a conference room, Anveshika (Innovative Physics Lab), yoga, music, dance, art and craft rooms, two libraries, two audio-visual rooms, separate physics, chemistry, biology and mathematics labs, and three computer labs equipped with systems and broadband connection.

Jagran Public School meets the basic requirements of a CBSE +2 School. It also has a basement used for annual exhibitions, small cultural events, and indoor sports competitions. There is pre-primary section, separate hostels for 90 boys and 70 girls, and it includes the principal's residence along with residences for the hostel wardens and in-charges (both boys and girls).

SCHOOL HALL & GROUND

The school hall has a hall that is generally the venue for various interhouse as well as interschool events, seminars, workshops and counseling sessions. The hall is ventilated and can accommodate an audience of around 200 people. Moreover, the hall is often used for various celebrations by the hostel students. All around the school structure are gardens, playfields, and playing arenas so as to compensate the lack of playing grounds in the city. The school has a full-size football field, 3 volleyball courts, 1 basketball court, kho kho field and two badminton courts. The football field is surrounded by an embankment that has kitchen gardens where students can learn to grow vegetables. The other open areas consist of a school nursery, gardens, a pre-primary play area, and trees which are more than 100 years old.

PRE PRIMARY SECTION

The school has a separate pre-primary wing which has classrooms, an audio video room, and an open-air stage for younger students to showcase their talent. The students have their own sports periods and music periods with the aim of enhancing and honing their creative skills.

HOSTEL - HOME AWAY FROM HOME

In the school premises there is a hostel that is acts as a home away from home for around 165 girls & boys. These students often come from places outside of Lucknow, such as Uttar Pradesh, Bihar, Madhya Pradesh, Nepal, and even Europe.

CO_CURRICULAR ACTIVITIES & SPORTS

The school conducts more than 40 work activities. These activities include clay modeling, sculpturing, non-fire cooking, baking, gardening, papier mashie, tie & dye, batiq, and block printing. Debates, elocutions, quizzing, declamations among others are held every week. The school has participated and won laurels in the events of quizzing, IT events, dramatics, art & craft, science & technology, and many more at district, state and national level.

In sports, the school has won the CBSE cluster of volleyball, 7 times in a row. Many school volleyball players have played at district, region, state, and national levels. The school football team, floorball team, and cricket teams too have fared well at different levels of competition according to the school website.

External links
 School website 

Schools in Lucknow
Educational institutions established in 2007
2007 establishments in Uttar Pradesh